Gavlan or Gulan may refer to various places in Iran:
 Gavlan, East Azerbaijan
 Gulan, Kurdistan
 Gavlan, Koreh Soni, Salmas County, West Azerbaijan Province
 Gavlan, Zulachay, Salmas County, West Azerbaijan Province
 Gulan-e Sofla, Sardasht County, West Azerbaijan Province
 Gavlan, Urmia, West Azerbaijan Province